Saud Ibrahim Al-Nasr (Arabic:سعود إبراهيم النصر) (born 1 February 1998) is a Qatari footballer. He currently plays as a midfielder for Al-Wakrah.

Career
Al-Nasr started his career at Al-Sadd and is a product of the Al-Sadd's youth system. On 16 September 2017, Al-Nasr made his professional debut for Al-Sadd against Al-Markhiya in the Pro League, replacing Ahmed Sayyar .

Club
Al-Sadd
Qatar Cup: 2021

External links

References

1998 births
Living people
Qatari footballers
Al Sadd SC players
Al-Wakrah SC players
Qatar Stars League players
Association football midfielders
Place of birth missing (living people)